HMS Brazen was a Type 22 frigate of the Royal Navy. She was completed three months ahead of schedule due to the Falklands War.

Royal Navy service
Brazen served on the Armilla Patrol which became a task force during the Gulf War as part of Operation Granby. For this she received the battle honour "Kuwait 1991". On 24 January 1991, Brazen would screen the British Casualty Receiving ship  when a pair of Iraqi Mirage F1 aircraft made a run for the vessel, armed with AM39 Exocet anti-ship missiles. The Iraqi aircraft were shot down by Saudi F-15C fighter aircraft before they could fire their anti-ship missiles. During the war, her Lynx helicopter attacked fast patrol boats.

Following a patrol in the South Atlantic Brazen ran aground in the Patagonian Canal on 11 September 1994. The ship was refloated four days later and taken to Talcahuano for repairs, which lasted a month. She then returned to the UK under her own power for reinstatement of combat system equipment damaged in the incident at Devonport royal dockyard.

By late 1995, Brazen was back in active service, operating in the Adriatic Sea as part of a Royal Navy task group led by the aircraft carrier  for Operation Sharp Guard. In early 1996, Brazen rescued 30 Albanians from a sinking vessel. In May 1996, she returned to Devonport for the final time before being official handed over to the Brazilian Navy in August 1996.

Brazilian service
She was purchased from the United Kingdom by the Brazilian Navy on 18 November 1994, and renamed Bosísio. The ship was commissioned into the Brazilian Navy on 30 August 1996.

In June 2009, Bosísio participated in the recovery mission for the wreckage of Air France Flight 447.

She was decommissioned from Brazilian Navy service on 23 September 2015. The ship was sunk as a target in July 2017 during the Brazilian Navy operation 'MISSILEX 2017'.

References

Publications
 

1980 ships
Type 22 frigates of the Royal Navy
Type 22 frigates of the Brazilian Navy
Gulf War ships of the United Kingdom
Ships built on the River Clyde